Rio Grande Hospital is a critical access hospital in Del Norte, Colorado, in Rio Grande County. The hospital has  17 beds. In addition to the main hospital buildings in Del Norte, the hospital also operates clinics in Creede, South Fork, and Monte Vista.

The hospital is a Level IV trauma center.

History
The hospital was established in 1996 by the Valley Citizens’ Foundation for Healthcare, Inc., a community non-profit organization, succeeding an earlier hospital organization that closed in 1993.

References

External links
Hospital website

Hospitals in Colorado
Buildings and structures in Rio Grande County, Colorado
Hospitals established in 1996
1996 establishments in Colorado